Velleia is a genus of herbs in the family Goodeniaceae. Of the 22 species, 21 are endemic to Australia, and one is endemic to New Guinea. The genus was named by James Edward Smith, after Thomas Velley.

Species
Species include:
Velleia arguta R.Br.
Velleia connata F.Muell. 
Velleia cycnopotamica F.Muell.
Velleia daviesii F.Muell.
Velleia discophora F.Muell.
Velleia exigua (F.Muell.) Carolin
Velleia foliosa (Benth.) K.Krause
Velleia glabrata Carolin
Velleia hispida W.Fitzg.
Velleia lyrata R.Br.
Velleia macrocalyx de Vriese 
Velleia macrophylla (Lindl.) Benth.
Velleia montana Hook.f.
Velleia panduriformis Benth.
Velleia paradoxa R.Br.
Velleia parvisepta Carolin
Velleia perfoliata R.Br.
Velleia pubescens R.Br.
Velleia rosea S.Moore
Velleia spathulata R.Br.
Velleia trinervis Labill.

References

 
Asterales genera
Taxa named by James Edward Smith
Endemic flora of New Guinea